Shadowman is a fictional superhero who appears in comic books published by Valiant Comics. The character debuted in Shadowman #1 (May 1992), created by writers Jim Shooter and Steve Englehart, and artist David Lapham. Shadowman appears in his own series and video games, as well as numerous other Valiant comics. 

Shadowman is a lineage and four characters have taken up the mantle thus far in the comics and video games. The series protagonist is Jack Boniface.

Since his introduction, Shadowman has been a key character in the Valiant Universe and has sold over 5.3 million copies to date, with 80 issues published. Shadowman comics have been translated into a number of languages, including German, Italian, Spanish, Norwegian, Filipino and Chinese, among others. New Orleans mayor Sidney Barthelemy officially proclaimed January 17, 1993 as “Shadowman Day.”

Publication history

Original Valiant continuity
Shadowman debuted in 1992 as a flagship title in the Valiant Universe. After one year in publication, Shadowman was selling over 100,000 comics books a month. Shadowman would go on to guest star in a number of Valiant comics, fighting alongside other heroes in the Valiant Universe, most notably "Unity" and "Unity 2000".

Acclaim continuity
Shadowman eventually sold more than 5 million copies in total before Acclaim Entertainment bought Valiant for $65 million in 1996 and started a new Shadowman series under Acclaim Comics. Acclaim also published Shadowman video games. In preparation for the leap to video games a new action-oriented Shadowman took up the mask in comics. The second series of comics (spelled Shadow Man) featured the iteration of Shadowman that would gain huge popularity in the successful Shadow Man video game franchise. In a similar manner to the original iteration, the hero fought alongside other characters in the Acclaim Comics Universe, notably Unity 2000.

People who have worked on Shadowman characters and storylines include Marvel Comics Editor-in Chief Joe Quesada, former Marvel Comics Editor-in-Chief Jim Shooter, Frank Miller, Garth Ennis, Rob Liefeld, Barry Windsor-Smith, Jamie Delano, Steve Ditko, David Lapham, Rags Morales, Fabian Nicieza, Jim Starlin, Bob Layton, Jimmy Palmiotti, Walt Simonson and Ashley Wood. With issue seven Bob Hall took over writing chores and continued as the primary writer on the book until the first "Shadowman" run ended with issue 43.

Acclaim shut down all comic book publishing in 2002, in anticipation of a bankruptcy filing of its parent company after suffering heavy losses from its licensed sports video games. Shadowman and all other Valiant properties were sold to Valiant Entertainment.

Powers

Valiant Comics
As Shadowman, Jack possesses paranormal strength, endurance, agility, and reflexes, night vision, regenerative healing, gliding capabilities, depleted fear, and other voodoo powers.

Valiant Entertainment
Possessee's hosted to the Shadow Loa have a great many expanded upon abilities. The natural physical enhancements & psychological reinforcements that come with being Busou Kobalamin's host remain paramount, but are also complemented by a host of other powers which accommodate them. Such as necromancy, afterlife traversal, shadow & darkness manipulation on top of mastery over the deadside and it's monstrous denizens.

In other media

Film
In 1999, Acclaim Entertainment was approached by rapper/actor Ice Cube with a pitch to make a feature film. Acclaim declined this offer, as they were focused on the success of the video game franchise. In June 2017, it was reported that Valiant Entertainment had hired Reginald Hudlin to direct a film adaptation, and also co-write the screenplay with Adam Simon.

Web series
Shadowman appears in the web series Ninjak vs. the Valiant Universe, portrayed by Damion Poitier.

Video games

In 1999, Shadow Man was released on the Nintendo 64, PlayStation, Dreamcast, and PC. A sequel, entitled Shadow Man: 2econd Coming, was released in 2002 as a PlayStation 2 exclusive. In all the Shadow Man franchise has sold over 2 million copies and grossed close to 100 million dollars in revenue. Nintendo released a Shadow Man themed limited edition N64 console. Both games focus on the Acclaim Comics version of the character, Michael LeRoi.

Music

In 2015, heavy metal band A Sound of Thunder released a concept album entitled Tales from the Deadside based on Shadowman. The album was released on compact disc, vinyl, and digital formats. The album features original artwork by Bob Hall and Roberto de la Torre. A limited 7 inch vinyl picture disc for album tracks "Tower of Souls" and "Punk Mambo" was also released in 2015.

Collected editions

References

External links
World of Black Heroes: Jack Boniface (Original) Biography
World of Black Heroes: Re-Imagined Jack Boniface Biography
World of Black Heroes: Mike LeRoi Biography
Thoughts on Shadowman by one of the writers of volume 3, Christopher J. Priest

1992 comics debuts
Valiant Comics titles
Comics characters with superhuman strength
Comics adapted into video games
Comics by Steve Englehart
Comics characters with accelerated healing
Comics characters with superhuman senses
Fiction about Louisiana Voodoo
Fictional characters from New Orleans
Valiant Comics superheroes